Birdsong is a 2008 film by Catalan auteur Albert Serra. The film recounts the journey of the three wise men as they travel to meet the Baby Jesus. Serra shot and edited over 100 hours of footage for the film. Canadian film critic Mark Peranson played Joseph.

Reception 

A. O. Scott, writing for The New York Times, called Birdsong "less a retelling of the Nativity story than a dream about it, filtered... through a sensibility that recalls Luis Buñuel and Samuel Beckett".

Birdsong won several prizes at the 2009 Gaudí Awards.

References 

General references

External links 
 

2008 films
2000s Hebrew-language films
2000s Catalan-language films
Films about Christianity
Films directed by Albert Serra